Dusty is the ninth studio album by American rapper Homeboy Sandman. It was released on October 18, 2019, through Mello Music Group with distribution via The Orchard. Recording sessions took place at Sung Moon Recordings in Buffalo, New York. Production was handled entirely by Mono En Stereo. It features guest appearances from Quelle Chris and Your Old Droog.

Music videos
Music video for "Far Out", directed by Rob Shaw & Bent Image Lab, was premiered at BrooklynVegan on September 25, 2019. Music video for "Noteworthy", directed by HaiTao Wu, was released on October 17, 2019. Music video for "Live & Breath", directed by Nate Peracciny, was released on January 29, 2020. Music video for "Name" was directed by Paul Stevenson.

Critical reception 

Dusty garnered positive reviews from music critics. At Metacritic, which assigns a normalized rating out of 100 to reviews from mainstream critics, the album received an average score of 72, based on 4 reviews.

AllMusic writer Paul Simpson praised Mono En Stereo's soundscape of "laid-back, ambling jazz and funk grooves" for complimenting Sandman's "conversational, matter-of-fact rhymes" throughout the album, concluding that "Dusty is another winning set of pointed observations from Sandman, who effortlessly unloads his thoughts without seeming like a burden on the listener." Patrick Taylor of RapReviews found Mono's use of live instrumentation samples "effortless and low-key" to make the production feel organic and Sandman sounding more "loose and free" to quickly deliver "engaging and clever" lyrics, concluding that "Dusty goes down as smooth as an ice cold beer on a warm day, and should not be missed."

Track listing

Personnel

 Angel Del Villar II – main artist
 Gavin Christopher Tennille – featured artist (track 13)
 Your Old Droog – featured artist (track 13)
 Mono En Stereo – producer
 Andrew Esposito – additional percussion, recording, mixing
 Ryan Bress – recording, mixing
 Alejandro "Sosa" Tello – mastering
 Sarah Mattmiller – cover art
 Lisa Wollter – art direction
 Austin Hart – layout
 Johnny Navarro – photography
 Michael Tolle – executive producer

References

External links
 Dusty at Bandcamp
 

2019 albums
Homeboy Sandman albums
Mello Music Group albums